Symphony Soldier is the second and most recent studio album by American rock band The Cab. It was self released by the band on August 23, 2011. The Cab first rose to prominence at the peak of the mid-2000s emo pop trend with their debut album Whisper War (2008), which was promoted via national tours with Hey Monday and the Hush Sound. The following year, the band lost two members, including guitarist Ian Crawford and bassist Cash Colligan. In addition, the band soon parted ways with their original label, scene stalwart Fueled by Ramen.

The album boasts a wide array of songwriting collaborators, including Bruno Mars, Adam Levine and Jesse Carmichael of Maroon 5, Fall Out Boy's Pete Wentz, and production team The Messengers. It was produced by John Feldmann, and recorded at his home studio, Foxy Studios. Musician Brandon Paddock performed guitar and bass on the LP, with Crawford and Devin Bronson contributing additional guitar. Dean Butterworth—best known for his work with Good Charlotte—handled all drum work.

Symphony Soldier was entirely funded by the group, and was self-released. Its commercial performance was middling, with the album charting on the Billboard 200 at number 62. It was the Cab's last proper album; though the band signed to Universal Republic the next year and issued an EP, Lock Me Up, in 2014, it was officially dissolved. In 2016, Billboard contributor Joe DeAndrea referred to the album as "arguably one of the most ambitious pop-rock records in recent memory."

Release
Ian Crawford, the group's former lead guitarist, played guitar for the album. With most music and lyrics written by band members, guest artists include Pete Wentz and John Feldmann co-writing "Grow Up and Be Kids" and Bruno Mars with "Endlessly."

The album was originally released independently following the group's departure from Fueled by Ramen/Decaydance Records. The Cab funded the entire album, with lead vocalist Alexander DeLeon tweeting, "We paid for it all on our own and refused to take no for an answer."

Pre-orders were available on the band's webstore, the only place the physical album can be purchased. Their webstore offered 11 options, with prices ranging from $10 to $10,000. The $10,000 "General of the Army" fan pre-order included bonuses such as:
 Alex DeLeon and Alex Marshall write a song in their honor, which is then performed and recorded
 An iPod Touch with The Cab catalog on it, and some of the group's favorite songs
 "Guest list for life" at all their appearances
 An autographed guitar

The album's first single, "Bad," was released to iTunes on July 11, 2011, and was announced by the band on July 18; a music video for the song was later released.

The album received critical praise, with AbsolutePunk giving it a positive review with a rating of 95%, calling the album a "masterpiece." The album art was revealed on July 19. It debuted on the US Billboard 200 at No. 62.

Promotion
In support of Symphony Soldier the band toured as headliners and supporters, as well as playing at radio station sponsored shows. Among that, they have opened for All Time Low, Simple Plan for their US fall tour in 2011, Avril Lavigne on a Canadian arena concert tour and Maroon 5 during their Asia Pacific tour in 2012.

Media usage
"Angel with a Shotgun" was used by many people as a form of Nightcore. A uploaded nightcored version of the song became the most viewed nightcore video on youtube.

Track listing

Personnel

The Cab
Alexander DeLeon – lead vocals
Alex Marshall – rhythm guitar, piano, backing vocals
Joey Thunder – bass guitar
Chantry Johnson – lead guitar, cello, backing vocals
Frank Sidoris - rhythm and lead guitar

Additional personnel

John Feldmann – production, co-write on "Grow Up and Be Kids"
Ian Crawford – guitar 
Dean Butterworth – drums
Devin Bronson – guitar on "Angel with a Shotgun"
Brandon Paddock – guitar, bass, additional programming and arrangements
Pete Wentz – co-write on "Grow Up and Be Kids"
Bruno Mars – co-write on "Endlessly"
Adam Levine and Jesse Carmichael– co-write on "Animal"
Evan Taubenfeld – co-write on "Angel with a Shotgun"
The Messengers – co-write on "Temporary Bliss"
Martin Johnson from Boys Like Girls - co-write and additional production on "Bad"

Charts

References

2011 albums
The Cab albums
Albums produced by John Feldmann